Fagundes Rafael Mariano, also known as Rafael Jataí, is a Brazilian professional footballer who plays as defensive midfielder for Botafogo-PB.

Career
Is half revealed in the basic categories of Atlético Paranaense. Up to mid-professional in August 2009 and debuted in defeating the Roosters to the Corinthians by 2-0.

Career statistics
(Correct )

Contract
 Clube Atlético Mineiro.

References

External links
 Galo Digital
 soccerway
 ogol.com.br
Futpedia

1989 births
Living people
Brazilian footballers
Clube Atlético Mineiro players
Guarani FC players
Ipatinga Futebol Clube players
Rio Branco Esporte Clube players
Tupi Football Club players
Hapoel Ironi Kiryat Shmona F.C. players
Expatriate footballers in Israel
Brazilian expatriates in Israel
Association football midfielders
Sportspeople from Goiás